The Men's individual table tennis – Class 2 tournament at the 2012 Summer Paralympics in London took place from 30 August to 3 September 2012 at ExCeL Exhibition Centre. Classes 1-5 were for athletes with a physical impairment that affects their legs, and who competed in a sitting position. The lower the number, the greater the impact the impairment was on an athlete's ability to compete.

In the preliminary stage, athletes competed in six groups of three. Winners of each group qualified for the finals stages.

Results
All times are local (BST/UTC+1)

Finals

Preliminary round

Group A

30 August, 11:00

30 August, 18:00

31 August, 16:00

Group B

30 August, 11:00

30 August, 18:00

31 August, 16:00

Group C

30 August, 11:40

30 August, 18:40

31 August, 16:00

Group D

30 August, 11:40

30 August, 18:40

31 August, 16:00

Group E

30 August, 11:40

30 August, 18:40

31 August, 16:40

Group F

30 August, 11:40

30 August, 18:40

31 August, 16:40

References

MI02